Christopher Richard Cornes (born 20 December 1986) is an English football manager and former player who is now the manager of  club Worcester City.

Cornes played as a forward. A former Wolverhampton Wanderers trainee, he enjoyed a successful loan spell to Port Vale in 2005, having signed a professional contract at Wolves the previous year. He tested positive for cocaine in February 2006, and received a six-month ban from the game, before his contract was cancelled in September that year. He then joined Worcester City, before moving on to Telford United the following year. In 2008, he joined Stourport Swifts via Bromsgrove Rovers. The next year he was back at Worcester and Stourport Swifts, also playing on loan for Evesham United, before signing with Malvern Town via Redditch United in summer 2010. He was imprisoned on drug dealing charges in 2015.

He co-managed Worcester Raiders to the West Midlands (Regional) League Division One title at the end of the 2018–19 season. He left the club in October 2021 and was appointed Bewdley Town manager in January 2022, before taking charge of Worcester City ten months later.

Playing career

Wolverhampton Wanderers
Cornes attended Pershore High School, before beginning his career as a trainee with Championship club Wolverhampton Wanderers, turning professional in July 2004. He joined League One side Port Vale on loan in August 2005, making his debut on 28 August in Vale's goalless draw at Milton Keynes Dons – picking up the man of the match award in the process. He scored both goals against Oldham Athletic on 28 September, and followed this by getting goals against Walsall and Swindon Town, leaving him with a streak of four goals in three games. He returned to Molineux at the end of November, having scored four times in eleven first team appearances for the "Valiants".

In February 2006 Cornes tested positive for cocaine and was given a six-month ban. Initially Wolves stood by him and allowed him to continue training. However, in September 2006 his contract was cancelled by mutual consent.

Non-League
At the end of his ban in October 2006 he joined Conference North side Worcester City, and two months later signed until the end of the season. However, he fell out of favour and joined Northern Premier League Premier Division side Telford United on loan in March 2007, helping Telford to promotion to the Conference North via the play-offs. He turned down interest from a number of league clubs to sign a one-year contract with Telford in May 2007.

He terminated his contract with Telford in January 2008, with the club and Cornes coming towards the end of a club disciplinary process. He joined Bromsgrove Rovers in the Southern League Premier Division later that month, aiming for a fresh start. The club were relegated at the end of the 2007–08 campaign, and Cornes decided to leave when new manager Rod Brown took charge in October 2008. Later that month he joined Stourport Swifts in the Southern League Division One Central, along with his former Bromsgrove manager Duane Darby.

In July 2009, he was released the Swifts, his fitness an issue. He promptly returned to old club Worcester City for pre-season training. Worcester loaned him out to Evesham United in August 2009, before he re-signed with Stourport six weeks into his loan spell.

In June 2010 he joined Conference North side Redditch United. Two months later he switched clubs to Midland Football Alliance outfit Malvern Town. At the end of the 2010–11 campaign Malvern were relegated to the West Midlands (Regional) League. He later played for Littleton in the Midland Combination.

Style of play
Stourport manager Neil Hunt described him as "a playmaker, he doesn't track back or run around but his quality on the ball is undeniable."

Management career
Cornes, alongside Karl Gormley, co-managed Worcester Raiders to promotion as champions of the West Midlands (Regional) League Division One in the 2018–19 season. The 2019–20 and 2020–21 seasons were abandoned due to the COVID-19 pandemic in England. He left the club seven games into the 2021–22 campaign, with club captain Danny Flowers suggesting on Twitter that he was "pushed out by the chairman".

On 12 January 2022, Cornes was announced as the new manager of Midland League Premier Division club Bewdley Town, who were then bottom of the table. Bewdley finished second-from-bottom at the end of the 2021–22 season, but were reprieved from relegation.

On 12 November 2022, Cornes was installed as manager at Worcester City, also of the Midland League Premier Division.

Legal troubles
Cornes was arrested in May 2015 for possession of class A drugs with intent to supply and money laundering after £40,000 of high purity cocaine and "a substantial amount of cash" was found in the back of a car in Worcester. He pleaded guilty and was sentenced to four years and four months in prison.

Career statistics
Source:

Honours

Playing
Telford United
Northern Premier League Premier Division play-offs: 2007

Managerial
Worcester Raiders (co-manager)
West Midlands (Regional) League Division One: 2018–19

References

1986 births
Living people
Sportspeople from Worcester, England
English footballers
Association football midfielders
Association football forwards
English sportspeople in doping cases
Doping cases in association football
Wolverhampton Wanderers F.C. players
Port Vale F.C. players
Worcester City F.C. players
AFC Telford United players
Bromsgrove Rovers F.C. players
Stourport Swifts F.C. players
Evesham United F.C. players
Redditch United F.C. players
Malvern Town F.C. players
Littleton F.C. players
English Football League players
Northern Premier League players
Midland Football Alliance players
Drug dealers
English football managers
Worcester City F.C. managers